The Kingdom of Belgium is unique in having three networks of representation — one for the Belgian federal state, another for Dutch-speaking community and Flemish Region, and a third one for the French-speaking Community and the Walloon region, often comprising international missions of the Brussels-Capital Region and, more rarely, the German-speaking Community of Belgium. However officers representing the governments of the communities and Brussels, Flanders and Wallonia are usually co-located together with the diplomatic representation of Belgium, as most countries do not consider regions to be states.

Excluded from this listing are honorary consulates, representative offices of the communities and regions of Belgium, development offices, and trade missions. On the other hand, the trade mission in Taipei, known as the "Belgian Office, Taipei (BOT)" is included as it serves as a de facto embassy to Taiwan.

Current missions

Africa

Americas

Asia

Europe

Oceania

Multilateral organizations

Gallery

Closed missions

Africa

Americas

Asia

Europe

See also

 Foreign relations of Belgium
 List of diplomatic missions in Belgium
 Visa policy of the Schengen Area

Notes

References

External links
 Belgian Ministry of Foreign Affairs
 Flanders Department of Foreign Affairs

 
Belgium
Diplomatic missions